Figueira Cid (born 18 January 1957), is a Portuguese actor and filmmaker. He has acted in both European and African films across three decades of cinema career. He is most notable for the roles in the films, Ministério do Tempo, Até Amanhã, Camaradas and The masked avenger: Lagardère.

Personal life
He was born on 18 January 1957 in Lisbon, Portugal.

Career

Filmography

References

External links
 
 ‘The Witch THEATER’ breaks the silence
 Transvestite father cries son's death
 To think that the arts would be more prominent in this government "was a mistake"
 luís varela
 The Witch Theater presents new show until Saturday

1957 births
Living people
20th-century Portuguese male actors
21st-century Portuguese male actors
Portuguese theatre people
Portuguese film actors